Gyeonghwa or Kyunghwa (경화) may refer to:
 Lady Gyeonghwa (경화궁부인)
 Princess Gyeonghwa (Gongyang) (경화궁주)
 Queen Gyeonghwa (경화왕후)
 Princess Gyeonghwa (경화공주)
 Kyung-hwa (경화) (Korean given name)
 Yu Kyung-hwa (유경화)
 Sung Kyung-hwa (성경화) 
 Park Kyung-hwa (박경화)
 Kim Kyong-hwa (김경화)
 Kyung Wha Chung (정경화)
 Kyunghwa Lee (이경화)
 Han Kyeong-hwa (한경화)
 Kang Kyung-wha (강경화)
 Gyeonghwa Station (경화역)